Avonbridge railway station was a station on the Slamannan Railway. The line connected mines and villages in the Central Scotland.

History
Opened by the Slamannan Railway, then joining the Edinburgh and Glasgow Railway, was absorbed into the North British Railway. It became part of the London and North Eastern Railway during the Grouping of 1923. The station was then closed by that company.

The site today

The station has been demolished but a set of level crossing gates mark the site.

References

Notes

Sources
 
 
 
 Station on navigable O.S. map

External links
 RAILSCOT on the Slamannan Railway

Disused railway stations in Falkirk (council area)
Railway stations in Great Britain opened in 1840
Railway stations in Great Britain closed in 1930
Former North British Railway stations
1840 establishments in Scotland
1930 disestablishments in Scotland